Isohypsibius elegans is a species of tardigrades in the class Eutardigrada. It is found in Sicily.

References

External links 

Parachaela
Animals described in 1971
Fauna of Sicily
Taxa named by Maria Grazia Binda